Alice Ritzman (born March 1, 1952) is an American professional golfer, who played on the LPGA Tour from 1978 to 1998.

Early career
Ritzman was born in Kalispell, Montana, on March 1, 1952. She won the Montana Junior Championship three times. She also won the Montana State Women's Amateur Championship in 1972 and 1973. She was inducted in the Montana State Women's Golf Association's Hall of Fame in 1991. She attended college at Eastern Montana College in Billings.

Ritzman was coached by Harvey Penick in Austin, Texas, where he worked as the golf coach at the University of Texas. Penick wrote a book on golf in which he refers to Ritzman as "little Alice Ritzman".

Some notable results:
 She has five career holes-in-one.
 Her best results were three playoff losses she suffered: to Kathy Whitworth at the 1981 Coca-Cola Classic, to Hollis Stacy at the 1981 West Virginia Bank Classic, and to Betsy King at the 1986 Rail Charity Classic.
 During her first full year on Tour in 1979, Ritzman established an LPGA all-time record, which still stands, by carding three eagles in one round at the 1979 Colgate European Open.
 In 1986, she posted her career-low round of 64 at the Rochester International.
 She played in 401 LPGA events.
 Crossed the $1 million mark in career earnings in 1992.
 When she retired in 1998, she had the highest ranking on the career money list (43) as a non-winner with $1,490,016.

Later career
Ritzman retired from professional golf in 1998 to become a golf commentator for ESPN. She stills plays golf on the Legends Tour. She subsequently worked as a realtor.

Current life
Ritzman is a real estate agent in Kalispell, Montana. She teaches golf to the boys and girls at Flathead High School. She is also a member of the Board of Trustees of School District 5 of the Kalispell Public Schools. She has a tournament named after her at Buffalo Hill Golf Club: the Alice Ritzman Golf Tournament.

Playoff record
LPGA Tour playoff record (0–3)

References

External links 

American female golfers
LPGA Tour golfers
Golfers from Montana
People from Kalispell, Montana
1952 births
Living people
21st-century American women